Solnówek  is a settlement in the administrative district of Gmina Miasteczko Krajeńskie, within Piła County, Greater Poland Voivodeship, in west-central Poland.

The settlement has a population of 41.

References

Villages in Piła County